Scopula luteolata is a moth of the  family Geometridae. It is found in western North America. In Canada, the range extends from the mountains of south-western Alberta, north to Banff and west to Vancouver Island. In the United States, it has been recorded from Arizona, California, Montana, Nevada, New Mexico, Oregon, Washington and Wyoming. The habitat consists of montane wooded and shrubby openings and edges in forests.

The wingspan is 23–26 mm. Adults are yellow-brown, with darker grey-brown median and postmedian lines. There is one generation per year with adults on wing from mid June to late July in the northern part of the range.

References

Moths described in 1880
luteolata
Moths of North America